Heart Beats is an album by the Keystone Trio – pianist John Hicks, bassist George Mraz, and drummer Idris Muhammad.

Background
The trio of pianist John Hicks, bassist George Mraz, and drummer Idris Muhammad was assembled for a recording led by saxophonist Archie Shepp in 1995. That session was produced by Todd Barkan for Venus Records. He commented that "It was magic! A telepathy, balance, and cohesiveness that I rarely hear."

Recording and music
The album was recorded at Clinton Recording Studios in New York City, on December 4, 1995. Barkan was the producer. Vocalist Freddy Cole was added for the track "It Had to Be You".

Release
Heart Beats was released by Milestone Records.

Reception

The Penguin Guide to Jazz described the album as "piano-trio jazz of the very highest quality". AllMusic concluded that "You're not going to find a better trio than this one, and even more impressive is that each tune seems to be just the right length, with no excess or filler."

Track listing
"Speak Low"
"I Fall in Love Too Easily"
"If I Should Lose You"
"It Had to Be You"
"How Deep Is the Ocean"
"Bewitched, Bothered, and Bewildered"
"Dancing in the Dark"
"Two Hearts"
"Stay as Sweet as You Are"

Personnel
John Hicks – piano
George Mraz – bass
Idris Muhammad – drums
Freddy Cole – vocals (track 4)

References

John Hicks (jazz pianist) albums
1995 albums